The Haitian occupation of Santo Domingo was the annexation and merger of then-independent Republic of Spanish Haiti (formerly Santo Domingo) into the Republic of Haiti, that lasted twenty-two years, from February 9, 1822 to February 27, 1844. While many Haitians view the invasion and occupation of Spanish Santo Domingo as a "unification" of the island designed to protect their country from re-enslavement via the Spanish side, Dominicans consider it as a forced military invasion and occupation. The Haitian occupation's suppression of Dominican culture (including the Spanish language and Catholic Religion), forceful redistribution of Dominican wealth, and strict policies based on labor led to growing resentment that culminated in a Dominican movement for national independence, which was attained in February 1844.

This Haitian of invading and occupy the Spanish part of the island of Hispaniola, was an illegitimate and illegal action, because with this invasion, the Haitians violated the eighth article of the Treaty of Paris of 1814 and The Ordinance of Carlos X of 1825 that they were prohibited from doing such an action.

In the Dominican Republic Independence Day is celebrated on February 27, the day of revolt against Haitian occupation.

Background
By the late 18th century, the island of Hispaniola had been divided into two European colonies: Saint-Domingue, in the west, governed by France; and Santo Domingo, governed by Spain, occupying the eastern two-thirds of Hispaniola. By the 1790s, large-scale rebellions erupted in the western portion of the island, spearheaded by men such as Toussaint Louverture and Jean-Jacques Dessalines which led to the eventual removal of the French and the independence of Haiti. Following the independence of Haiti, massive portions of the remaining French population were murdered. The eastern portion of the island was preparing itself for an eventual separation from Spain.

First unification under the French

During the second half of the eighteenth century, Saint-Domingue quickly developed into the most prosperous plantation colony of the New World. As a result of the sugar plantations of the French colony worked by African slaves; sugar had become an indispensable commodity in Europe. By contrast, Santo Domingo, the eastern side that had once been the headquarters of Spanish colonial power in the New World, had long fallen into decline. The economy was stalled, the land largely unexploited and used for subsistence agriculture and cattle ranching, and the population was much lower than in Saint-Domingue. The accounts by the Dominican essayist and politician José Núñez de Cáceres cite the Spanish colony's population at around 80,000, mainly composed of criollos, mulattos, freedmen, and a few black slaves. Saint-Domingue, on the other hand, was nearing a million slaves.

In the aftermath of the war between the new French Republic and Spain, the latter, by the Peace of Basel of 22 July 1795, ceded its two-thirds of the island to France in exchange for the evacuation of the province of Guipuzcoa occupied by the French since 1793. However, due to the near chaotic situation in Saint-Domingue resulting from uprisings by mulattos and freedmen since 1791, the expected armed opposition of the Spanish settlers of Santo Domingo who feared the abolition of slavery if the French were to take over, and under the belief that the British would seize Santo Domingo if the transfer was effected, the Committee of Public Safety decided to delay the occupation until such time as it had enough military and naval forces to take possession of the eastern part of the island. This was to occur in January 1801 when Toussaint Louverture, then still loyal to France, occupied Santo Domingo in the name of the French Republic. In 1804 the leader of the Haitian revolution, Jean-Jacques Dessalines, declared Haiti's independence. Independence did not come easily given the fact that Haiti had been France's most profitable colony.

Under Toussaint Louverture's government, slavery was abolished for the first time on the eastern portion of Hispaniola until the colony was ceded to France. While the French had lost their former colony of Saint-Domingue by 1804, the French commander of the former Spanish side had been able to repulse the attacks of Jean-Jacques Dessalines, but in 1808 the people revolted and the following year, with the help of a Royal Navy squadron, ended French control of the city of Santo Domingo. Spanish rule was reestablished. However, this short period under which the whole of Hispaniola was de jure under French rule was to be the chief justification of the freed Haitians in their quest to reunite the island under their rule.

1805: Invasion of Santo Domingo

In February 1805, Haitian forces, under Jean-Jacques Dessalines, invaded from the southern route in opposition of French-led approved slave raiding. Unable to overpower the Spanish-French defense, and intimidated by the arrival of a French fleet in support of Borgella in Santo Domingo, the army of Dessalines along with Henri Christophe raided through the interior Dominican towns Santiago and Moca, while Alexandre Pétion invaded Azua. On his retreat from Santo Domingo, Dessalines arrived in Santiago on 12 April 1805. While in Santiago, Haitian forces set fire to the town, including churches and convents. The army killed approximately 400 inhabitants including some priests and took prisoners to Haiti. More people were killed on Dessalines' orders in the French-held portions of the island, including the towns of Monte Plata, Cotuí and La Vega and approximately 500 people of the northern town of Moca. The barrister Gaspar de Arredondo y Pichardo wrote, "40 [Dominican] children had their throats cut at the church in Moca, and the bodies found at the presbytery, which is the space that encircles the church's altar..." Survivors from the raids fled to western locations including Higüey through Cotuí as well as to other territories of the Spanish Antilles. Prisoners rounded up by the troups were forced to accompany the army back to Haiti, where, once they arrived, were either killed or forced to work on plantations. In total, over the course of a few weeks, nearly half of Santo Domingo's population were slaughtered by the Haitian soldiers.

1806: Struggle to unite the South and North of Haiti

 On October 17, 1806, Dessalines was assassinated, an act which was instigated by his own generals Henri Christophe and Alexandre Pétion. Afterward, both Christophe and Pétion failed to agree on who was going to be the next leader-for-life (a title created by Dessalines himself), so they went separate ways: Christophe took the North of Haiti (which he named "Kingdom of Haiti"), while Pétion got for himself the South part of Haiti (the newly created "Republic of Haiti"); and immediately they started a series of wars to take over the other's side. The internal military conflicts lasted until 1820 when Haitian president Jean-Pierre Boyer finally unified both the South and North of Haiti. After this, Boyer aimed his sights on the struggling Spanish-side of the island.

1821: Independence from Spain

On 9 November 1821, Spanish colonial rule over Santo Domingo was overthrown by a group led by José Núñez de Cáceres, the colony's former administrator, and the rebels proclaimed independence from the Spanish crown on 1 December 1821. The new nation was known as Republic of Spanish Haiti (Spanish: República del Haití Español), as Haiti had been the indigenous name of the island. On 1 December 1821 a constitutive act was ordered to petition the union of Spanish Haiti with Gran Colombia.

Prelude to the occupation

A group of Dominican politicians and military officers favored uniting the newly independent nation with Haiti, as they sought for political stability under Haitian president Jean-Pierre Boyer, and were attracted to Haiti's perceived wealth and power at the time. A large faction based in the northern Cibao region were opposed to the union with Gran Colombia and also sided with Haiti. Boyer, on the other hand, had several objectives in the island that he proclaimed to be "one and indivisible": to maintain Haitian independence against potential French or Spanish attack or reconquest and to maintain the freedom of its former slaves.

While appeasing the Dominican frontier officers, Jean-Pierre Boyer was already in negotiations with France to prevent an attack by fourteen French warships stationed near Port-au-Prince, the Haitian capital. The Dominicans were unaware that Boyer made a concession to the French, and agreed to pay France 150 million gold francs destined to compensated the former French slave owners. Thus, Haiti would essentially be forced into paying reparations for its freedom.

Support of the unification found itself to be more popular amongst the Black population who believed that Boyers government would usher an era of social reform, including the abolition of slavery. In contrast, the white and multiracial populations, however, found themself split on the idea of merging with the neighboring country. After deals with Bolivar fell through and receiving messages of economic and military support from Boyer, Caceres found himself more obliged to side with Creole Haiti. The idea had been gaining some traction among members of the military, and in 1821 Governor Sebastián Kindelán y Oregon discovered that some of the Dominican military officers in Azua and Santo Domingo had already become part of the plan for unification with Haiti. A defining moment took place on November 15, 1821, when the leaders of several Dominican frontier towns, particularly Dajabón and Montecristi, adopted the Haitian flag.

The Dominican nationalists who were against the unification of the island were at a serious disadvantage compared to the Haitian military, having at their disposal only an untrained infantry force. Haiti's population was eight to ten times larger than that of the Dominican population, and the Dominicans had to also contend with a severely underdeveloped economy. The Haitian military had been hardened after decades of conflict with European powers and rival political factions in Haiti, and memories of the numerous racial massacres of the Revolution were still fresh in the mind of Haitian troops, increasing their determination to never lose a battle.

Occupation
After promising his full support to several Dominican frontier governors and securing their allegiance, Boyer ceremoniously marched into the country with 12,000 soldiers in February 1822, against a significantly smaller, untrained army serving some 70,000 Dominican souls (Haiti had a population around 600,000 people). On 9 February 1822, Boyer formally entered the capital city, Santo Domingo after its ephemeral independence. The island was thus united from "Cape Tiburon to Cape Samana in possession of one government." Upon unification of both French-side (Haitï) and Spanish-side (then Spanish Haiti) nations under the Haitian flag, Boyer divided the island into six departments, that were subdivided into arrondissements (administrative districts) and communes. The departments established in the west were, Nord, Ouest, Sud, and Artibonite, while the east was divided into Ozama and Cibao. This period led to large-scale land expropriations and failed efforts to force production of export crops, impose military services, restrict the use of the Spanish language, and suppress traditional customs . There was also a resurgence of the decades-old rivalries between the governing Haitian elite (mulattoes) and the masses of the black population, most notably throughout the western end .

In order to raise funds for the huge indemnity of 150 million francs that Haiti agreed to pay the former French colonists, and which was subsequently lowered to 60 million francs, the Haitian government imposed heavy taxes on the Dominicans. Since Haiti was unable to adequately provision its army, the occupying forces largely survived by commandeering or confiscating food and supplies at gunpoint . Attempts to redistribute land conflicted with the system of communal land tenure (terrenos comuneros), which had arisen with the ranching economy, and some people resented being forced to grow cash crops under Boyer and Joseph Balthazar Inginac's Code Rural instituted in 1838 . In the rural and rugged mountainous areas, the Haitian administration was usually too inefficient to enforce its own laws. It was in the city of Santo Domingo that the effects of the occupation were most acutely felt, and it was there that the movement for independence originated. Dominican citizens also had more rights than the Haitians who were under Jean-Pierre Boyer's code rural, and often functioned as their own overseers.

Haiti's constitution also forbade white elites from owning land, and the major landowning families were forcibly deprived of their properties. Many emigrated to Cuba, Puerto Rico (these two being Spanish possessions at the time) or Gran Colombia, usually with the encouragement of Haitian officials, who acquired their lands. The Haitians, who associated the Roman Catholic Church with the French slave-masters who had exploited them before independence, confiscated all church property, deported all foreign clergy, and severed the ties of the remaining clergy to the Vatican. Santo Domingo's university, the oldest in the Western Hemisphere, lacking both students and teachers had to close down, and thus the country suffered from a massive case of human capital flight .

Although the occupation instated a constitution modeled after the United States Constitution throughout the island, and led to the abolition of slavery as an institution in what became known as the Dominican Republic, forms of slavery persisted in Haitian society. 

After the annexation of the whole island by Haiti, Black refugees who had been subjected to slavery in foreign territories (including Puerto Rico and Martinique) escaped to Santo Domingo and successfully claimed freedom under Haitian law. They testified to local Dominican officials (who now worked for the Haitian government) that they had sought to travel to Santo Domingo because they viewed it as a "free country" after annexation by Haiti. 

Several resolutions and written dispositions were expressly aimed at converting average Dominicans into second-class citizens as Boyer had done with the Haitian peasantry under the aforementioned Code Rural: restrictions of movement, prohibition to run for public office, night curfews, inability to travel in groups, banning of civilian organizations, and the indefinite closure of the state university (on the alleged grounds of its being a subversive organization) all led to the creation of movements advocating a forceful separation from Haiti with no compromises.

Resistance and subsequent Independence
In 1838 a group of educated nationalists, among them, Matías Ramón Mella, Juan Pablo Duarte and Francisco del Rosario Sánchez founded a secret society called La Trinitaria to gain independence from Haiti. After they revealed themselves as revolutionaries working for Dominican independence, the new Haitian president, Charles Rivière-Hérard, exiled or imprisoned the leading Trinitarios. At the same time, Buenaventura Báez, an Azua mahogany exporter and deputy in the Haitian National Assembly, was negotiating with the French Consul-General for the establishment of a French protectorate.

In an uprising timed to preempt Báez, on February 27, 1844, the Trinitarios declared independence from Haiti, backed by Pedro Santana, a wealthy cattle-rancher from El Seibo who commanded a private army of peons who worked on his estates. This marked the beginning of the Dominican War of Independence.

Aftermath and Dominican Independence (1844)

After the struggles that were made by Dominican patriots to free the country from Haitian control, they had to withstand and fight against a series of incursions that served to consolidate their independence (1844–1856). Haitian soldiers would make incessant attacks to try to gain back control of the nation, but these efforts were to no avail, as the Dominicans would go on to win every battle. Haiti's military forces of 1805 were eroded over the next 50 years by the constant power struggles. What military was left devolved into a local repression force and served at the behest of a series of dictators and warlords well into the 20th century.

Territorial disputes
Neighboring towns and cities like Hincha (now Hinche), Juana Méndez (now Ouanaminthe), San Rafael de La Angostura (now Saint-Raphaël), San Miguel de la Atalaya (now Saint-Michel-de-l'Atalaye), Las Caobas (now Lascahobas), and Veladero (now Belladère), among others, remained isolated with little communication with the Dominican capital whilst there were a growing Haitian influence, as the gourde circulated and in addition to the Spanish language, Haitian Creole was also spoken; eventually becoming Haitian territories; however, these cities would often be disputed between the two countries. The boundary was finally set in 1929, and demarcated in 1935–1936.

Governors
Jérôme-Maximilien Borgella (9 February 1822 – 1832)
Bernard-Philippe-Alexis Carrié (1832 – February 1843)
Charles Rivière-Hérard (1843)
Léo Hérard (1843 – 27 February 1844)

See also
Dominican War of Independence
Haitian Revolution
History of the Dominican Republic
History of Haiti

Notes

References

1822 establishments in Haiti
1844 disestablishments in Haiti
19th-century conflicts
19th century in the Dominican Republic
Dominican Republic–Haiti relations
Former countries in the Caribbean
History of Hispaniola
History of Haiti
History of the Dominican Republic
States and territories established in 1822
States and territories disestablished in 1844
History of Gran Colombia
Military occupation